The 1924–25 Southern Branch Grizzlies men's basketball team represented the Southern Branch of the University of California during the 1924–25 NCAA men's basketball season and were members of the Southern California Intercollegiate Athletic Conference. The Grizzlies were led by fourth year head coach Pierce "Caddy" Works and finished the regular season with a record of 11–6 and were champions of their conference with a record of 9–0.

Previous season

The 1923–24 Southern Branch Grizzlies finished with a conference record of 8–2 and finished second in their conference under third year coach Caddy Works. To signify the growth of the university, the southern branch adopted the 'Grizzlies' mascot.

Roster

Schedule

|-
!colspan=9 style=|Regular Season

Source

References

UCLA Bruins men's basketball seasons
Southern Branch Grizzlies Basketball
Southern Branch Grizzlies Basketball
Southern Branch